Oumar Loum (born December 31, 1973) is a former Senegalese sprinter who specialized in the 200 metres. He competed at the Olympic Games three times, never progressing to the final.

Competition record

Personal bests
Outdoor
100 metres – 10.17 (-0.4) (Bamako 2002)
200 metres – 20.21 (+0.6) (Mexico City 2000)

Indoor
200 metres – 20.90 (Liévin 1995, 2001)

External links

1973 births
Living people
Senegalese male sprinters
Athletes (track and field) at the 1992 Summer Olympics
Athletes (track and field) at the 1996 Summer Olympics
Athletes (track and field) at the 2000 Summer Olympics
Athletes (track and field) at the 2004 Summer Olympics
Olympic athletes of Senegal
African Games bronze medalists for Senegal
African Games medalists in athletics (track and field)
Athletes (track and field) at the 1999 All-Africa Games
Athletes (track and field) at the 2003 All-Africa Games
Athletes (track and field) at the 2007 All-Africa Games
Islamic Solidarity Games competitors for Senegal
Islamic Solidarity Games medalists in athletics
20th-century Senegalese people
21st-century Senegalese people